Riho Päts (26 June 1899, Tartu - 15 January 1977, Tallinn) was an Estonian composer, choir director, music journalist and music teacher.

References 

1899 births
1977 deaths
Estonian conductors (music)
20th-century Estonian composers
Estonian educators
Estonian musicologists
Estonian Academy of Music and Theatre alumni
Academic staff of the Estonian Academy of Music and Theatre
People from Tartu
Burials at Metsakalmistu
20th-century musicologists